The Gama River is a river located in Milne Bay Province of Papua New Guinea. Gama River flows into the Swinger Bay of Milne Bay. Water was used during World War II by HMAS Ladava and Naval Base Milne Bay

See also

Rivers of Papua New Guinea
Geography of Milne Bay Province
Naval Base Milne Bay
Southern Region, Papua New Guinea